= Malakal Power Plant =

Power plant in Koror, Palau

- Country: Palau
- Location: Koror, Palau
- Coordinates: 7°20′05″N 134°27′23″E
- Status: Operational
- Commission date: 1982

Thermal power station
- Primary fuel: Diesel fuel

Power generation
- Units operational: 8
- Nameplate capacity: 23.7 MW

The Malakal Power Plant is a fossil fuel power station in Koror, Palau.

== History ==
The first unit of the power plant was commissioned in 1982 with a capacity of 1.25 MW. In November 2024, the power plant underwent upgrading process for its control panel systems.

== Generation units ==
Currently the power plant consists of 8 installed diesel generators with a total installed capacity of 23.7 MW.
